The North Wales Alliance League was a football league in Wales. It was made up of teams from Wrexham County Borough,  Flintshire and Denbighshire

History
The North Wales Alliance League ran during the early years of the twentieth century from 1912-1921.

At that time the senior clubs in the Wrexham area played in English leagues such as The Combination and the Birmingham & District League.

Clubs from the Wrexham area, and the rest of North Wales, joined the Welsh National League (North) which ran from 1921-1930.

Divisional Champions

See also
Football in Wales
Welsh football league system
Welsh Cup
List of football clubs in Wales

References

Welsh National League (Wrexham Area)
Football leagues in Wales
Sport in Wrexham
Defunct football competitions in Wales
Sports leagues established in 1912
1912 establishments in Wales
1921 disestablishments in Wales
Sports leagues disestablished in 1921